Ukrainian Beer Lovers Party, UBLP was a short-lived political party in Ukraine. It was registered on November 10, 1991 and copresided by Volodymyr Yermakov, Petro Serhiyenko and Pavlo Tarnovsky .

It should not be confused with another Russophone organization Ukrainian Beer Lovers Party, UBLP (УПЛП), which is not officially registered.

Party goals:
establishment of the rule-of-law state in accordance with the international standards
creation of new economy, new economic relationship between people
awakening and raise of the people's dignity through the cultural education
expansion and improvement of the food products, including beer

Unlike other, UBLP had left close to no trace in the history of Ukraine. In a pre-election survey, UBLP was supported by 3% of population (Voice of Ukraine newspaper, October 13, 1993). In the 1994 Parliamentary Elections of Ukraine the UBLP secured only 1806 (<0.01%)  votes and got no seats.

In 1996 the party claimed to enlist 1,599 members UBLP

In 1997 TBLP entered into the electional bloc "Free Democrats" (Свободные демократы), which included the Liberal Democratic Party of Ukraine and Party of Free Peasants of Ukraine (Партія вільних селян).

References

Beer Lovers Parties
Defunct political parties in Ukraine
Political parties established in 1991
1991 establishments in Ukraine